Clubul Sportiv Universitatea Alba Iulia, commonly known as CSU Alba Iulia, is a professional women's basketball team from Alba Iulia, Romania. The team plays in the Liga Națională.

Current roster

References

External links
 Eurobasket 

Alba Iulia
Basketball teams in Romania
Women's basketball teams in Romania
Basketball teams established in 2007
2007 establishments in Romania